Atlingbo is a populated area, a socken (not to be confused with parish), on the Swedish island of Gotland. It comprises the same area as the administrative Atlingbo District, established on 1January 2016.

Geography 
Atlingbo is situated in the central part of Gotland. The medieval Atlingbo Church is located in the socken.

, Atlingbo Church belongs to Vall-Hogrän-Atlingbo parish in Eskelhems pastorat, along with the churches in Vall and Hogrän.

References

External links 

Objects from Atlingbo at the Digital Museum by Nordic Museum

Populated places in Gotland County